Rangsial is a village in the Punjab province of Pakistan. It is located at 32°43'0N 72°41'0E with an altitude of 811 metres (2664 feet).

References

Villages in Punjab, Pakistan